Gönen is a town and district of Isparta Province in the Mediterranean region of Turkey. The population is 3,567 as of 2010.The mayor is Mete Elcim (MHP). The cement plant is a major source of greenhouse gas.

References

External links
 District municipality's official website 

Populated places in Isparta Province
Districts of Isparta Province
Towns in Turkey